Imran Ghulam (born 1 February 1980) is a cricketer who plays for the Bahrain national cricket team. He played in the 2013 ICC World Cricket League Division Six tournament.

References

External links
 

1980 births
Living people
Bahraini cricketers
Pakistani expatriate sportspeople in Bahrain
Place of birth missing (living people)